Jim Michaels (born September 12, 1965, in Chicago, Illinois) is an American television producer. He is the son of Anna Mae and Robert Michaels and was raised in the suburbs of Des Plaines and Arlington Heights. Michaels graduated from John Hersey High School in Arlington Heights, Illinois, and attended the University of Evansville and graduated with a degree in business. Michaels started and ran the in house computer graphics department at MCA/Universal Studios.

Michaels subsequently moved into television production, eventually producing the NBC series Midnight Caller and Reasonable Doubts. Michaels other series included; Charlie Grace for ABC; Turks, The Guardian and Dr. Vegas for CBS; Odyssey 5; for Showtime; and Lois & Clark: The New Adventures of Superman. Michaels is a member of the Producers Guild of America, Directors Guild of America, Screen Actors Guild, the Academy of Television Arts & Sciences, American Film Institute and has guest lectured at the Academy of Art, UCLA and NYU. Michaels worked with Ali LeRoi and Chris Rock producing the television series Everybody Hates Chris for all four seasons, and joined the production team at Supernatural for the 2009–2020 seasons.

Early life 

He is the son of Anna Mae and Robert Michaels and was raised in the suburbs of Des Plaines and Arlington Heights. Michaels graduated from John Hersey

Michaels graduated from the University of Evansville in Evansville, Indiana. He has 2 siblings, Steve and Christine.

Supernatural 

Jim Michaels became the co-executive producer of the TV series Supernatural with Warner Brothers Television in British Columbia at the beginning of Season 5, a role which was previously filled by Kim Manners for seasons 1–4.

Career 
The Chicago native landed his first producing gig on the NBC series Midnight Caller starring Gary Cole. He next served as a producer co-producer of the NBC series Reasonable Doubts, a one-hour drama starring Mark Harmon and Academy Award winner Marlee Matlin.

For three seasons beginning in 1993, Michaels was co-producer of Lois & Clark: The New Adventures of Superman. That year he had an offscreen role as the aquatic theater's announcer in the movie Free Willy.

Some of Michaels' other producing credits include Charlie Grace, a one-hour ABC detective drama starring Mark Harmon as a private detective raising a 12 year old LeeLee Sobieski. Jim Michaels also produced Escape from Atlantis, a two-hour cable movie for Starz/Encore.

Michaels' next project was the CBS series, Turks, starring William Devane followed by Cover Me: Based on the True Life of an FBI Family series for the USA Network. Michaels subsequently produced The Guardian pilot for CBS, the Odyssey 5 series for Showtime followed by Dr. Vegas for CBS.

Michaels produced the Golden Globe nominated Chris Rock inspired series Everybody Hates Chris. This show set the record for highest rated comedy ever to air on the UPN/CW network.

With the canceling of Everybody Hates Chris after 88 episodes, Michaels joined the producing team at Supernatural in the beginning of season 5 for Warner Bros. Television where he continues to see it to the end of the final season 15 until he moved into a new role as a producer of the next TV series which is set to be announced at the end of Supernatural.

Michaels, along with Sean Astin, just completed a documentary, Remember the Sultana, with the help of over 930 Kickstarter contributors about the largest maritime disaster to ever happen in America.

Michaels' been a featured keynote speaker all over the United States for various organizations including the AFCI and many Universities including UCLA, Academy of Art University and NYU. He is a longtime member of the Producers Guild of America (PGA). Michaels is also a member of the Academy of Television Arts and Sciences (Emmy's) as well as Screen Actor's Guild (SAG-AFTRA) and the Directors Guild of America (DGA).

He has produced projects that have filmed in nine US states and two Canadian provinces. Illinois, Hawaii, California, Pennsylvania, Arizona, Nevada, Oklahoma, Florida, Ontario, British Columbia and Utah.

Awards 
A veteran of the TV and movie business, who produced shows such as Midnight Caller, Lois and Clark and Everybody Hates Chris, Jim Michaels joined Supernatural in Season 5. Michaels is very engaged with fandom on social media, and was named by Entertainment Weekly as one of the "Top 20 Show Runners To Follow on Twitter".
People's Choice Award

2017 People's Choice Award for Sci-Fi/Family TV Series

References

1965 births
Living people
Businesspeople from Chicago
Television producers from Illinois
People from Arlington Heights, Illinois
People from Des Plaines, Illinois
John Hersey High School alumni